Euphorbia inconstantia is a species of plant in the genus Euphorbia and the family Euphorbiaceae.

References 

inconstantia